Lynne Hutchison OLY (born 10 November 1994 in Tokyo, Japan) is a British rhythmic gymnast who represented England at the 2010 Commonwealth Games in Delhi, India, where she won a bronze medal in the team event. She also competed for Team GB at the 2012 Summer Olympics in London, United Kingdom.

Hutchison was born in Tokyo to Japanese mother Kuniko and British father Brian. She moved to Britain with her family at the age of two. Hutchison, while attending primary school in Combe Down, Bath, was invited by Sarah Moon, the head coach of the City of Bath Rhythmic Gymnastics Club, to come along to the gym. Hutchison started training at the club on the same day as Francesca Fox, who would later also represent Great Britain at the 2012 Summer Olympics. Hutchison attended King Edward's School, Bath, and trained at the University of Bath.

Hutchison OLY is on track for a 2:1from a prestigious Russel Group University. Also known by her close friends as 'Lynnay'.

References

External links
 Lynne Hutchison at British Gymnastics
 
 
 
 
 

1994 births
Living people
British rhythmic gymnasts
English gymnasts
English sportswomen
English people of Japanese descent
Olympic gymnasts of Great Britain
Gymnasts at the 2012 Summer Olympics
Commonwealth Games medallists in gymnastics
Commonwealth Games bronze medallists for England
Gymnasts at the 2010 Commonwealth Games
Gymnasts at the 2014 Commonwealth Games
Sportspeople from Tokyo
People educated at King Edward's School, Bath
21st-century British women
Medallists at the 2010 Commonwealth Games